Satish Kumar is an Indian politician and a member of the Bharatiya Janata Party. He won the 2014 Indian general elections from the Aligarh constituency of Uttar Pradesh.

Early life and education
Born to Damodar Gautam and his wife Ram Devi on 1 July 1972 in Aligarh, Uttar Pradesh, Satish Kumar has completed his education till the matriculation level.

Political career 

 In May 2014 elected to 16th Lok Sabha
 In May 2019 elected to 17th Lok Sabha
 Member of standing committee: Chemicals & fertilizers from September 2014 to July 2015 
 From September 2014 to 23 July 2015: Member, Standing Committee on Chemicals and Fertilizers 
 Member, Consultative Committee, Ministry of Railways 
 23 July 2015 onward: Member, Standing Committee on Labour

Personal life
Satish married Meenakshi Gautam on 30 April 1993. He is fond of sports, particularly Kabaddi.

References

Living people
India MPs 2014–2019
Lok Sabha members from Uttar Pradesh
People from Aligarh district
Bharatiya Janata Party politicians from Uttar Pradesh
1972 births
India MPs 2019–present